Roanoke Park is a  park between the north Capitol Hill and Portage Bay neighborhoods in Seattle, Washington. It occupies the block bounded by E. Edgar and Roanoke Streets on the north and south and 10th Avenue E. and Broadway E. on the east and west, just northeast of the junction of State Route 520 and Interstate 5.

The park was named by David T. Denny and Henry Fuhrman after Roanoke, Virginia. It was bought by the city of Seattle in 1908.

References

External links
Parks Department page on Roanoke Park
National Register of Historic Places Registration Form: Roanoke Park Historic District. Online on the site of the Washington State Department of Transportation.

1899 establishments in Washington (state)
Parks in Seattle
Historic districts on the National Register of Historic Places in Washington (state)
National Register of Historic Places in Seattle